Pocatello High School is a four-year public high school in Pocatello, Idaho, United States. It is the oldest of the three traditional high schools of the Pocatello/Chubbuck School District  and serves the southwest portion. The school colors are red, blue, and white. The mascot was an "Indian"; the city's namesake, Chief Pocatello, was the leader of the Shoshone people. The mascot was changed to the Thunder in June 2021 due to insensitivity.

History
The school was constructed in late spring and summer of 1892 at a cost of $18, 281. According to the Bannock County Historical Society, the school was originally called West Side School, holding all grades in the same school. Pocatello High School was the most impressive building in the area during the early 1900s and on many occasions the school served as a town square where concerts and athletic contests were held. Two presidents of the United States spoke on the grounds of Pocatello High School, President Theodore Roosevelt in 1902 and William Howard Taft in 1908. John F. Kennedy would visit in 1962 and speak during a campaign trip.

In 1914, a fire started in the boiler room and the high school burnt completely to the ground. The school was rebuilt in exactly the same location. There were several minor additions to the school in 1901, 1903, 1916, and 1920. In 1939, the old school was remodeled and additions were made including a new gymnasium currently known as "the pit". In 1968, a fine arts addition was added and included choir, band, drama and art classrooms. Due to an concerns around energy efficiency, most large windows designed by architect Frank Paradice were boarded over and smaller energy conserving windows were added in 1981. In 1996 major renovations were added to the school which took three years to complete. These renovations included new floors, lights, sidewalks, heating system, and windows.  A new gymnasium known as "the palace" was built in 2004. In 2019, a new ADA-accessible main entrance and remodeled administration offices were added to the school. A new science wing and catwalk between the two buildings was completed in 2021. 

Architect Frank H. Paradice, Jr., who moved to Pocatello around 1915, reportedly designed the high school, presumably the new construction one replacing the one destroyed by fire in 1914.

In September 2016, Monsanto awarded a grant of $15,000 for the development of a hydroponic greenhouse for the roof of the Museum of Clean to teach students about green energy and how plants grow. Wind turbines and solar panels will generate power, such as to provide electricity for lights during the nighttime. It is part of a project involving the partnership of the high school with the museum. The installation is targeted for completion in the fall of 2017.

In December 2021, a construction project connected the two buildings of Pocatello High School, as well as adding several new classrooms and a "commons" area. 

Since the 1950's, there have been sightings and reports of paranormal activity on the property. Urban legends have been proven fake but rumors among students hearing voices and feeling hugged remained under speculation for years. In 2014, security camera footage caught what many to believe was a ghost. In 2019 Ghost Hunters (TV series) investigated the school for the first episode of the 13th season.

Achievements
In 1989, Pocatello High School received the Presidential Excellence award, one of only 165 awards given in the nation.

Athletics
Pocatello competes in athletics in IHSAA Class 4A in the Great Basin (East) Conference with Century and Preston. PHS traditionally competed with the largest schools in the state in Class 5A (formerly A-1); a drop in enrollment caused a change to Class 4A. The school will move back to 5A classification in the 2024-25 school year due to increase in enrollment from mandatory school boundaries established in 2018. 

 From 2011-2015 the boys cross country won 5 state Championships in a row.
 In 2000, the boys basketball team successfully defended the A-1 (now 5A) state championship.
 The PHS football team won the state 4A title in November 2006.
 Four A-1 (now 5A) state titles in football were won in six-season span (1989, 1990, 1992, 1994).
 The 2012 baseball team won the state 4A championship, its first.

Rivalries
Pocatello High School has intra-city rivalries with Highland (1963) and Century (1999). The annual football game between Pocatello and Highland is known as the "Black and Blue Bowl." A tradition of rivalry between the schools is to paint the large rock outside of the other schools.

State titles
Boys
 Cross Country (6): fall 1980; (4A) 2011, 2012, 2013, 2014, 2015 (introduced in 1964)
 Basketball (9): 1927, 1929, 1936, 1942, 1957, 1962, 1969, 1999, 2000
 Wrestling (7): 1968, 1972, 1973, 1974, 1990, 1991, 1992 (introduced in 1958)
 Baseball (1): (4A) 2012 (records not kept by IHSAA, state tourney introduced in 1971)
 Track (2): 1958; (4A) 2009
 Golf (3): 1957, 1962, 1990, 2007, 2008 (introduced in 1956)
 Football (5): fall 1989, 1990, 1992, 1994: (4A) 2006 (official with introduction of playoffs, fall 1979)
(unofficial poll titles - 0) (poll introduced in 1963, through 1978)

Girls
 Cross Country (2): fall 1995, 1996 (introduced in 1974)
 Volleyball (1): fall 1990 (introduced in 1976)
 Track (5): 1975, 1982, 1994, 1995, 1996 2022 (introduced in 1971)
 Dance: All-State Champions 2012

Controversy
In October 2013, a former girls' basketball coach, Laraine Cook, was fired over a Facebook photo where her fiancé, Tom Harrison, a football coach at Pocatello High School, holds her breast.  Cook told the local Pocatello ABC affiliate that she was fired and not Harrison because she was the one who posted the photo.

Until the 1970s, the Pocatello High School mascot was a Native American caricature named Osky Ow Wow, "a little Mohawk-looking guy with buck teeth, dark skin, big round eyes and a Mohawk haircut." As late as 2015, the school's dance team, the Indianettes, continued to perform a redface routine in which female students dressed up in stereotypical Native American outfits and performed a mock "Indian" dance. In December 2020, the Pocatello School District selected "Thunder" as the high school’s new mascot, effective June 2021.

The murder of Cassie Jo Stoddart took place in Pocatello, Idaho, on September 22, 2006, when Stoddart (born December 21, 1989), a student at Pocatello High School, was stabbed to death by classmates Brian Lee Draper (born March 21, 1990) and Torey Michael Adamcik (born June 14, 1990).

Notable alumni
 Babe Caccia (1936), head football coach of the Idaho State Bengals
 Kent Hadley, professional baseball player (Kansas City Athletics, New York Yankees, Nankai Hawks)
 Duke Sims, professional baseball player (Cleveland Indians, Los Angeles Dodgers, Detroit Tigers, New York Yankees, Texas Rangers)
 Mark Nye (politician), state legislator for the state of Idaho

Popular culture
Pocatello High School featured in the August 29, 2019 episode of Ghost Hunters.

References

External links

Schools in Bannock County, Idaho
Pocatello, Idaho
Public high schools in Idaho
1892 establishments in Idaho
Educational institutions established in 1892